John Cork is a writer and producer.

John Cork may also refer to:

John Cork (MP)

See also
Jack Cork